Twilight was a sternwheeler towboat, built in 1864 at Middletown, Pennsylvania, as the Traveler. She was rebuilt in 1882 by Lew Clark as Twilight, and again renamed in May 1927 at J. H. McCrady. She was nicknamed "The Cat with Nine Lives" because she was involved in so many accidents.

Incidents and activities 

 May 13, 1891 – Burned with two other vessels at the base of Ferry Street in Pittsburgh
 April 1898 – Sunk after striking the 43rd Street bridge in Pittsburgh, pushing its hog chain braces through the hull
 December 3, 1905 – Sunk after running over Lock 2 of the Monongahela River during a flood
 February 1909 – Engineer James A. Hornbake drowned near Duquesne, Pennsylvania
 September 27, 1913 – Twilight took part in a parade celebrating Allegheny County, Pennsylvania's 125th anniversary. The parade consisted of 30 steamboats which sailed from Monongahela Wharf down the Ohio to the Davis Island Dam. The boats in line were the parade flagship Steel City (formerly the Pittsburgh and Cincinnati packet Virginia), City of Parkersburg, Charles Brown, Alice Brown, Exporter, Sam Brown, Boaz, Raymond Horner, Swan, Sunshine, I. C. Woodward, Cruiser, Volunteer, A. R. Budd, J. C. Risher, Clyde, Rival, Voyager, Jim Brown, Rover, Charlie Clarke, Robt. J. Jenkins, Slipper, Bertha, Midland, Sam Barnum, Cadet, Carbon, Twilight, and Troubadour.
 October 7, 1917 – Sunk near Braddock, Pennsylvania, after nosing into the water while traveling at full speed
 1918 – Accidentally destroyed the 16th Street Bridge (Mechanics Bridge) when sparks from its funnels set the wooden structure on fire
 November 15, 1920 – Caught fire and was severely damaged near Pittsburgh
 January 17, 1921 – Sunk near 31st Street in Pittsburgh

References

External links 

1864 ships
Paddle steamers of the United States
Riverboats
Ships built in Pennsylvania
Steamboats of the Monongahela River
Towboats